This is a list of Royal Air Force Trade Groups (RAF TG).  Each ground trade in the Royal Air Force (RAF) is assigned to a Trade Group (TG), which it operates under for command and control.

Originally, the trades were organised in groups numbering I, II, III, IV and V, and M for any medical associated trades.  They were changed into the 22 Trade Groups as shown below in 1951, and have since undergone amalgamation into 19 groups in 1964, and down to 18 by the early 2000s.  With further amalgamations, only 17 of the original groups now exist.

Notes

References

Lists
Air Force
Royal Air Force lists